Ashok Kumar (born 28 October 1959) is an Indian wrestler. He competed in the men's freestyle 52 kg at the 1980 Summer Olympics.

References

External links
 

1959 births
Living people
Indian male sport wrestlers
Olympic wrestlers of India
Wrestlers at the 1980 Summer Olympics
Place of birth missing (living people)
Asian Games bronze medalists for India
Asian Games medalists in wrestling
Wrestlers at the 1982 Asian Games
Medalists at the 1982 Asian Games
Commonwealth Games gold medallists for India
Commonwealth Games silver medallists for India
Commonwealth Games medallists in wrestling
Recipients of the Arjuna Award
Wrestlers at the 1978 Commonwealth Games
Wrestlers at the 1982 Commonwealth Games
20th-century Indian people
Medallists at the 1978 Commonwealth Games
Medallists at the 1982 Commonwealth Games